Electric Bird Digest is the sixth full-length album by rock band Young Fresh Fellows.  It was the last Young Fresh Fellows album released by Frontier Records, and was originally issued in 1991. The original LP included a free single with the songs "Zip-A-Dee-Doo-Dah", "Skyscraper of Facts" and "The Teen Thing".

Track listing
 Telephone Tree
 Sittin' on a Pitchfork
 Looking Around
 Hillbilly Drummer Girl
 Whirlpool
 Once in a While
 Teen Thing
 Thirsty
 Fear Bitterness and Hatred
 Hard to Mention
 Tomorrow's Gone (And So Are You)
 Evening
 There's a Love
 Swiftly But Gently

References

The Young Fresh Fellows albums
1991 albums
Frontier Records albums